Admiral Sir John Graham Hamilton,  (12 July 1910 – 27 October 1994) was a Royal Navy officer who served as Commander-in-Chief, Mediterranean Fleet from 1964 to 1967.

Naval career
Hamilton joined the Royal Navy in 1924, and specialised in gunnery in 1936.

Hamilton served in the Second World War on the staff of Admiral Sir Andrew Cunningham in the Mediterranean Fleet and was then Gunnery Officer on the battleship  in South East Asia. He also carried out the planning of the Naval Fire Support for the Normandy landings.

After the war, Hamilton commanded  before becoming deputy director of Radio Equipment in 1950. He went on to be commander of the 5th Destroyer Squadron in 1952 and Director of Naval Ordnance at the Admiralty in 1954. He was given command of the cruiser  in 1956 and became Naval Secretary in 1958. Then he became Flag Officer (Flotillas) for the Home Fleet in 1960 and Flag Officer, Air (Home) in 1962. His last appointment was as Commander-in-Chief, Mediterranean Fleet and NATO Commander Allied Forces Mediterranean in 1964. He retired in 1967.

References

|-

1910 births
1994 deaths
Royal Navy admirals
Royal Navy officers of World War II
Knights Grand Cross of the Order of the British Empire
Companions of the Order of the Bath
British military personnel of the Suez Crisis